Arthur Compton-Rickett (Arthur Rickett until 1908, born 20 February 1869, Canonbury, London – died 8 September 1937) was a lawyer, author, literary historian, and editor.

Biography
Born with the surname Rickett, he assumed the surname Compton-Rickett in 1908 when his father, Sir Joseph Compton-Rickett assumed the additional surname of Compton. Arthur Compton-Rickett, who had nine siblings, was the eldest of the four sons who were alive in the years from 1901 to 1919.

Arthur Rickett attended secondary school at Eastbourne College and at University School, Hastings, before matriculating at Christ's College, Cambridge in 1889. He graduated from Cambridge University with B.A. in 1892, LL.B. in 1894, M.A. in 1896, and LL.D. in 1905. On 27 January 1898 he was called to the bar at Inner Temple. In 1900 he became a lecturer in English literature and history for the Extension Board of the University of London, as well as the London County Council. In 1910 he became an Extension Lecturer for the University of Oxford.

He was the general editor of the book series Fireside Library published from 1924 to 1928 by Herbert Jenkins Ltd. He published essays, plays, and several books. Upon his death in 1937 his papers were left to Ella Mary Cressee (1885–1959).

Editor of The New Age
For part of the 1st decade of the 20th century, Arthur Rickett was the editor-in-chief of the British weekly magazine The New Age.

Selected publications
 
 as editor: 
 as editor:  1901
 
 
 
 
 
 with Thomas Hake:  
 as editor with Thomas Hake: 
 
 
 
 
 
 with Ernest Henry Short:

References

External links
 
 
 

1869 births
1937 deaths
Alumni of Christ's College, Cambridge
English biographers
English literary historians
English journalists
English male journalists
English magazine editors
English male non-fiction writers